Coptobasis dentalis is a moth in the family Crambidae. It was described by Pagenstecher in 1900. It is found in Papua New Guinea, where it has been recorded from the Duke of York Islands.

References

Moths described in 1900
Spilomelinae